This is a list of Buddhist temples, monasteries, stupas, and pagodas in the United States for which there are Wikipedia articles, sorted by location.

California

 Abhayagiri Buddhist Monastery, Redwood Valley
 Beginner's Mind Temple, San Francisco
 Berkeley Zen Center, Berkeley
 City Of Ten Thousand Buddhas, Talmage
 Deer Park Monastery, Escondido
 Fresno Buddhist Temple (Mrauk Oo Dhamma)
 Green Gulch Farm, Muir Beach
 Hartford Street Zen Center, San Francisco
 Hazy Moon Zen Center, Los Angeles
 Hsi Lai Temple, Hacienda Heights
 Koyasan Buddhist Temple, Little Tokyo, Los Angeles
 Metta Forest Monastery, Valley Center
 Mount Baldy Zen Center, Mount San Antonio
 Pao Fa Temple, Irvine
 Pacific Zen Institute, Santa Rosa
 San Fran Dhammaram Temple, San Francisco
 San Francisco Zen Center, San Francisco
 Senshin Buddhist Temple, Los Angeles
 Shasta Abbey, Mount Shasta
 Sonoma Mountain Zen Center, Santa Rosa
 Spirit Rock Meditation Center, Woodacre
 Tassajara Zen Mountain Center, Carmel Valley
 Walnut Grove Buddhist Church, Walnut Grove
 Wat Buddhanusorn, Fremont
 Wat Mongkolratanaram, Berkeley
 Yokoji Zen Mountain Center, near Idyllwild
 Zen Center of Los Angeles, Los Angeles
 Zenshuji Soto Mission, Los Angeles

Colorado

 The Great Stupa of Dharmakaya, Shambhala Mountain Center, Red Feather Lakes

Connecticut
 Buddhist Faith Fellowship of Connecticut
 Do Ngak Kunphen Ling Tibetan Buddhist Center for Universal Peace, Redding

Florida
 Guang Ming Temple, Orlando
 Tubten Kunga Center, Deerfield Beach
 Wat Florida Dhammaram, Kissimmee
 Wat Mongkolratanaram, Tampa

Georgia
 Atlanta Soto Zen Center, Atlanta

Hawaii

 Broken Ridge Buddhist Temple, Honolulu
 Byodo-In Temple, Kaneohe
 Daifukuji Soto Zen Mission, Honalo
 Daihonzan Chozen-ji, Kalihi Valley, Oahu
 Hawaii Shingon Mission, Honolulu
 Wood Valley Temple, Pahala

Illinois
 Buddhist Temple of Chicago, Chicago
 Chicago Zen Center, Evanston
 Daiyuzenji, Chicago

Kentucky
 Furnace Mountain, Stanton

Louisiana
 Chua Bo De, New Orleans
 New Orleans Zen Temple, New Orleans
 Wat Buddhasamakeevanaram, Bossier City

Maryland
 Kunzang Palyul Choling, Poolesville

Massachusetts

 Cambridge Zen Center, Cambridge
 New England Peace Pagoda, Leverett
 Valley Zendo, Charlemont
 Wat Boston Buddha Vararam, Bedford
 Wat Nawamintararachutis, Raynham

Michigan
 Lake Superior Zendo, Marquette
 Still Point Zen Buddhist Temple, Detroit

Minnesota
 Dharma Field Zen Center, Minneapolis
 Minnesota Buddhist Vihara, Minneapolis
 Minnesota Zen Center, Minneapolis

New Jersey

 Empty Cloud Monastery, West Orange
 Seabrook Buddhist Temple, Upper Deerfield Township
 So Shim Sa Zen Center, Plainfield

New Mexico
 Hokoji Zendo, Arroyo Seco
 Kagyu Shenpen Kunchab, Santa Fe
 Upaya Institute and Zen Center, Santa Fe
 Zuni Mountain Stupa, Grants

New York
 Blue Cliff Monastery, Pine Bush
 Chapin Mill Buddhist Retreat Center, Batavia
 Chogye International Zen Center, New York
 Chuang Yen Monastery, Kent
 Dai Bosatsu Zendo Kongo-ji, Livingston Manor
 Karma Triyana Dharmachakra, Woodstock
 Mahamevnawa Buddhist Meditation Center of New York, Staten Island
 New York Mahayana Temple, Leeds
 New York Zendo Shobo-Ji, Manhattan
 Rochester Zen Center, Rochester
 Shi Yan Ming, New York
 Vajiradhammapadip Temple, Centereach and Mount Vernon
 Village Zendo, New York
 Zen Center of Syracuse, Syracuse
 Zen Mountain Monastery, Mount Tremper

North Carolina
 Wat Carolina Buddhajakra Vanaram, Bolivia

Ohio
 Cleveland Buddhist Temple, Euclid

Oregon
 Great Vow Zen Monastery, Clarskanie

Pennsylvania
 Chenrezig Tibetan Buddhist Center of Philadelphia
 Chùa Bồ Đề, South Philadelphia
 Preah Buddha Rangsey Temple, Philadelphia
 Wat Khmer Palelai Monastery, Philadelphia

Rhode Island
 Providence Zen Center, Cumberland

Texas

 American Bodhi Center, Waller County
 Chua Buu Mon, Port Arthur
 Chua Linh-Son Buddhist Temple, Austin
 Jade Buddha Temple, Houston
 Maria Kannon Zen Center, Dallas
 Wat Buddhananachat of Austin, Del Valle

Utah
 Kanzeon Zen Center, Salt Lake City

Virginia
 Ekoji Buddhist Temple, Fairfax Station
 Wat Pasantidhamma, Carrollton

Washington

 Dai Bai Zan Cho Bo Zen Temple, Seattle
 Seattle Betsuin Buddhist Temple, Seattle
 Sravasti Abbey, Newport

Wisconsin
 Deer Park Buddhist Center and Monastery, Oregon
 Sotekizan Korinzenji, Madison

See also
 Buddhism in the United States
 :Category:Buddhism in the United States
 Buddhists in the United States military
 List of Buddhist temples

Notes

Sources
 BuddhaNet's Comprehensive Directory of Buddhist Temples sorted by country
 Buddhactivity Dharma Centres database

External links
 

 
 
United States
Buddhist temples